Kurken M. Alemshah (22 May 1907 – 14 December 1947) was an Armenian composer and conductor.

Biography
Alemshah was born in Bardizag  (now , near İzmit, Turkey). He began schooling in his own hometown, but during the Armenian Genocide his parents sent the young boy to Italy to continue his education in the Murat-Raphaelian Armenian School in Venice. In 1923, when his teachers there became aware of his striking musical gifts, they registered him at the Milan Conservatory to study music.

Following his graduation, Alemshah joined the faculty of the Paris branch of the Murat-Raphaelian school, where he organized the Giligia choir, performing not only in Paris, but also traveling to Venice, directing the choir in an all-Komitas program at St. Mark's Square. Alemshah continued to introduce the Armenian song to all music lovers: he presented Tchouhadjian's popular comic opera Leblebidji Hor-Hor Agha (The Chickpea Vendor), and Haygagan harsanik (The Armenian Wedding), a composition put together by combining Alemshah's own melodies with popular songs. In 1937, Haygagan harsanik received second prize in an international competition to which twenty nations participated.

Concurrently, Alemshah conducted the Alakyaz Choir on a number of occasions, initially to mark the establishment of the Soviet regime in Armenia, and later to benefit the Armenian War Relief efforts. In 1939, he was appointed conductor of the Sipan-Komitas Chorus. He conducted Tigranian's opera Anush and performed the Armenian Divine Liturgy in a number of French cathedrals.

In the fall  of 1947, Alemshah visited the United States for a series of appearances. In October, he conducted a concert at Town Hall, NY, devoted to Armenian orchestral and choral music. On 14 December 1947 he died in Detroit of a heart attack, a day before he was scheduled to perform in the city.

Alemshah sang with an individual voice. His music exhibits fluid and elegant melodies, exquisite refinement and poise. His feeling for poetic atmosphere—and the craftsmanship he used to communicate it—was unique, giving his songs a rare musical substance and emotional intensity.

Some of his scores were published in Paris in 1947 and his manuscripts are reposited in the Charents Museum of Literature and Arts in Armenia. A CD of Alemshah's complete solo songs, performed by Elisabeth Pehlivanian, and some of his choral works rendered by Komitas Chamber Choir have been released.

Selected works

Solo vocal
 Բուխուրիկ • Pukhurig (Stovepipe, 1934)
 Իմ երգը • Im yerkı (My Song)
 Ես սիրեցի • Yes siretsi (I Loved)
 Իմ եարը • Im yarı (My Beloved)
 Աղուորներուն • Aghvornerun (For the Lovely Maidens)
 Նազեր • Nazer (Coyness)
 Ծաղիկ էի • Dzaghig ei (I Was a Flower)
 Իղձ • Ights (Desire)
 Սիրելիս • Sirelis (My Love)
 Պճինկօ • Bjingo (A gangbang)

Choral
 Հայաստան • Hayasdan (Armenia)
 Անուշիկ եար ճան • Anushig yar jan (Beautiful Sweatheart)
 Մեր պարտիզում • Mer bardizum (In Our Garden)
 Հունձք • Huntsk (Harvest)
 Պլպուլն Աւարայրի • Blbuln Avarayri (The Nightingale of Avarayr)

Instrumental
Lamento et dance arménienne (Lament and Armenian Dance) for vn & pn

Orchestral
 Արեւելեան գիշերներ • Arevelyan kisherner (Oriental Nights, 1931)
 Հէքեաթ • Hekyat (A Tale)
 Երկու պատմուածք հազար ու մէկ գիշերներէն • Yergu badmvadzk hazar u meg kisherneren (Two Stories from The Book of One Thousand and One Nights)

Vocal-Orchestral
 Աւարայրի պատերազմը • Avarayri baderazmı (The Battle of Avarayr, 1934)

Incidental music
 Վարդավառ • Vartavar (Transfiguration, 1932)
 Ծովինար • Dzovinar

References

CD Recordings
Elisabeth Pehlivanian - Songs with piano
Armenian Composers of Asia Minor - Choral works
Komitas
The Battle of Avarayr

Further reading
 

Armenian composers
Armenians from the Ottoman Empire
1907 births
1947 deaths
Milan Conservatory alumni
Armenian conductors (music)
20th-century conductors (music)
20th-century composers
San Lazzaro degli Armeni alumni
Emigrants from the Ottoman Empire to Italy